Cyperus graciliculmis is a species of sedge that is endemic to an area in Rwanda.

The species was first formally described by the botanist Kåre Arnstein Lye in 1986.

See also
 List of Cyperus species

References

graciliculmis
Plants described in 1986
Flora of Rwanda
Taxa named by Kåre Arnstein Lye